Kaegi or Kägi is a surname. Notable people with the surname include:

 Adriana Kaegi, Swiss entertainer
 Gottfried Kägi (born 1911), Swiss skeleton racer who competed in the late 1940s
 Walter Kaegi, historian and scholar of Byzantine History, and professor of history in the University of Chicago
 Werner Kaegi (1901–1979), Swiss historian
 Werner Kaegi (composer) (born 1926), Swiss electronic music composer, musicologist and educator

Surnames of Swiss origin